The 1875 Horsham by-election was fought on 17 December 1875.  The byelection was fought due to the resignation of the incumbent Conservative MP, William Vesey-FitzGerald, who became Chief Charity Commissioner for England and Wales.  It was won by the Liberal candidate Robert Henry Hurst (junior). who had previously been MP for the seat but was defeated at the previous General Election.

This election was declared void and Hurst did not stand in the by-election in 1876.

References

1875 elections in the United Kingdom
1875 in England
19th century in Sussex
Horsham
By-elections to the Parliament of the United Kingdom in Sussex constituencies
December 1875 events
Annulled elections